The team dressage in equestrian at the 1932 Olympic Games in Los Angeles was held at the Riviera Country Club in Pacific Palisades on 10 August.

Competition format

The team and individual dressage competitions used the same results. Final standings were determined by adding the total points from each rider in the individual competition.

Results

References

External links
 Official Olympic Report

Team dressage